The Iranian Chess Championship is the yearly national chess championship of Iran. Below is the gallery of champions, notice the gap between 1980 and 1990 (1359 and 1369 according to the Iranian calendar), when chess was forbidden in Iran. There is also a gap between 1978 and 1980 (1356 and 1358) because of the Iran Revolution.

Champions

{| class="sortable wikitable"
! # !! Gregorian !! Iranian !! Winner
|-
| 1 || 1955/1956||1334||Yousof Safvat
|-
| 2 || 1956/1957||1335||Yousof Safvat
|-
| 3 || 1957/1958||1336||Yousof Safvat
|-
| 4 || 1958/1959||1337||Houshang Mashian
|-
| 5 || 1959/1960||1338||Yousof Safvat
|-
| 6 || 1960/1961||1339||Robert Lalazarian
|-
| 7 || 1961/1962||1340||Touraj Ebrahimi
|-
| 8 || 1962/1963||1341||Morteza Hemmasian
|-
| 9 || 1963/1964||1342||Mansour Jelveh
|-
| 10 || 1964/1965||1343||Keikhosro Kahyaei
|-
| 11 || 1966/1967||1345||Mohammad Hossein Farboud
|-
| 12 || 1967/1968||1346||Mohammad Hossein Farboud
|-
| 13 || 1968/1969||1347||Nasser Hemmasi
|-
| 14 || 1969/1970||1348||Nasser Hemmasi
|-
| 15 || 1970/1971||1349||Nasser Hemmasi
|-
| 16 || 1971/1972||1350||Khosro Harandi
|-
| 17 || 1973/1974||1352||Mehrshad Sharif
|-
| 18 || 1974/1975||1353||Mehrshad Sharif
|-
| 19 || 1975/1976||1354||Mehrshad Sharif
|-
| 20 || 1976/1977||1355||Mehrshad Sharif
|-
| 21 || 1977/1978||1356||Khosro Harandi
|-
| 22 || 1979/1980||1358||Mehrshad Sharif
|-
| 23 || 1980/1981||1359||Mehrshad Sharif
|-
| 24 || 1990/1991||1369||Khosro Harandi
|-
| 25 || 1991/1992||1370||Hadi Momeni
|-
| 26 || 1992/1993||1371||Hossein Aryanejad
|-
| 27 || 1993/1994||1372||Hadi Momeni
|-
| 28 || 1994/1995||1373||Esmaeil Safarzadeh
|-
| 29 || 1995/1996||1374||Hossein Aryanejad
|-
| 30 || 1996/1997||1375||Mohammad Deljou
|-
| 31 || 1997/1998||1376||Ehsan Ghaem-Maghami
|-
| 32 || 1998/1999||1377||Hassan Abbasifar
|-
| 33 || 1999/2000||1378||Ehsan Ghaem-Maghami
|-
| 34 || 2000/2001||1379||Ehsan Ghaem-Maghami
|-
| 35 || 2001/2002||1380||Elshan Moradi
|-
| 36 || 2002/2003||1381||Ehsan Ghaem-Maghami
|-
| 37 || 2003/2004||1382||Mohsen Ghorbani
|-
| 38 || 2004/2005||1383||Ehsan Ghaem-Maghami
|-
| 39 || 2005/2006||1384||Morteza Mahjoub
|-
| 40 || 2006/2007||1385||Ehsan Ghaem-Maghami
|-
| 41 || 2007/2008||1386||Ehsan Ghaem-Maghami
|-
| 42 || 2008/2009||1387||Morteza Mahjoub
|-
| 43 || 2009/2010||1388||Ehsan Ghaem-Maghami
|-
| 44 || 2010/2011||1389||Ehsan Ghaem-Maghami
|-
| 45 || 2011/2012||1390||Ehsan Ghaem-Maghami  Asghar Golizadeh
|-
| 46 || 2012/2013||1391||Asghar Golizadeh
|-
| 47 || 2013/2014||1392||Ehsan Ghaem-Maghami
|-
| 48 || 2014/2015||1393|| Ehsan Ghaem-Maghami
|-
| 49 || 2015/2016||1394|| Alireza Firouzja
|-
| 50 || 2016/2017||1395|| Parham Maghsoodloo
|-
| 51 || 2017/2018||1396|| Parham Maghsoodloo
|-
| 52 || 2018/2019||1397|| Alireza Firouzja
|-
| 53 || 2019/2020||1398||Ehsan Ghaem-Maghami
|-
| 54 || 2020/2021||1399||Parham Maghsoodloo
|}

Women

{| class="sortable wikitable"
! # !! Gregorian !! Iranian !! Winner
|-
| 1 || 1974/1975||1353||Shokooh Soroush-Azar
|-
| 2 || 1976/1977||1355||Shokooh Soroush-Azar
|-
| 3 || 1977/1978||1356||Shokooh Soroush-Azar
|-
|4
| 2000/2001||1379||Shadi Paridar
|-
|5
| 2003/2004||1382||Shadi Paridar
|-
|6
| 2004/2005||1383||Shadi Paridar
|-
|7
| 2006/2007||1385||Shadi Paridar
|-
|8
| 2007/2008||1386||Atousa Pourkashiyan
|-
|9
| 2008/2009||1387||Atousa Pourkashiyan
|-
|10
| 2009/2010||1388||Atousa Pourkashiyan
|-
|11
| 2010/2011||1389||Ghazal Hakimifard
|-
|12
| 2011/2012||1390||Atousa Pourkashiyan
|-
|13
| 2012/2013||1391||Mitra Hejazipour
|-
|14
| 2013/2014||1392|| Atousa Pourkashiyan
|-
|15
| 2014/2015||1393|| Atousa Pourkashiyan
|-
|16
| 2015/2016||1394|| Sarasadat Khademalsharieh
|-
|17
| 2016/2017||1395|| Vesal Hamedinia
|-
|18
| 2017/2018||1396|| Mobina Alinasab  
|-
|19
| 2018/2019||1397|| Anousha Mahdian
|-
|20
| 2019/2020||1398|| Anahita Zahedifar

|}

References

 Results from The Week in Chess: 2002, 2003, 2005, 2006 and 2008.
 Results from iranchess.com: 2004
 Results from ChessBase: 2008
 Results of Women's Championship from Chess-Results: 2006, 2008, 2009, 2010, 2011, 2012, 2014

Chess national championships
Women's chess national championships
Chess in Iran